Humans is a science fiction television series that debuted on 14 June 2015 on Channel 4. Written by the British team Sam Vincent and Jonathan Brackley, based on the Swedish science fiction drama Real Humans, the series explores the themes of artificial intelligence and robotics, focusing on the social, cultural, and psychological impact of the invention of anthropomorphic robots called "synths". The series is produced jointly by AMC in the United States, and Channel 4 and Kudos in Britain.

Channel 4 announced in May 2019 that there would not be a fourth series.

Series overview

Episodes

Series 1 (2015)

Series 2 (2016)

Series 3 (2018)

References

External links
 
 
 

Lists of American drama television series episodes
Lists of American science fiction television series episodes
Lists of British drama television series episodes
Lists of British science fiction television series episodes